The Khanda (Xanda), also known as Belaya, is a river in the Sakha Republic (Yakutia), Russia, a right tributary of the Aldan, part of the Lena basin. 

There are no settlements in the area of the river. The nearest inhabited places are Khandyga of Tompo District and Eldikan of Ust-Maysky District to the north and south of the river's mouth respectively.

In the International scale of river difficulty the Khanda is a Class II destination for rafting and kayaking.

Course
The Khanda originates in the Sette-Daban slopes, not far west of the Skalisty Range, in the southern area of the Verkhoyansk mountain system. 

In the upper section of its course the river flows across mountainous terrain, heading roughly westwards and cutting across the Ulakhan-Bom. The river turns then northwestwards flanking the northern end of the Kyllakh Range.

The river freezes in October and stays frozen until May.

See also
List of rivers of Russia

References

External links
Уровень воды в реке Белая (Ханда) (гп. Атырджах) - Water level
Fishing in the river (in Russian)

Rivers of the Sakha Republic
Verkhoyansk Range

de:Chanda (Aldan)
sah:Ханда